Barrow Hill is a hamlet in Essex, England. Barrow Hill is in the borough of Colchester and in the parliamentary constituency of Harwich and North Essex. The population of the hamlet is included in the civil parish of West Mersea.

It takes its name from a conspicuous Romano-British barrow.

External links
The Mersea Community and Business Portal
Some details of the barrow

Hamlets in Essex
Mersea Island